The Rötspitze is a mountain in the Hohe Tauern on the border between Tyrol, Austria, and South Tyrol, Italy.

References 

 Willi End: Alpenvereinsführer Venedigergruppe, München 2006, 
 Eduard Richter, Hrsg.: Erschließung der Ostalpen, III. Band, Verlag des Deutschen und Oesterreichischen Alpenvereins, Berlin 1894
 Raimund von Klebelsberg, Innsbruck: Geologie von Tirol, Gebrüder Borntraeger, Berlin 1935 
 Casa Editrice Tabacco: Carta topografica 1:25.000, Blatt 035, Valle Aurina/Ahrntal, Vedrette di Ries/Rieserferner Gruppe

External links 

Mountains of the Alps
Mountains of Tyrol (state)
Mountains of South Tyrol
Alpine three-thousanders
Austria–Italy border
International mountains of Europe
Venediger Group
Rieserferner-Ahrn Nature Park